Te Ngākau Civic Square is a public square in central Wellington, New Zealand, between the Wellington central business district to the north and the Te Aro entertainment district to the south.

Characteristics 

Te Ngākau Civic Square is located at 101 Wakefield Street, Wellington.

The square is surrounded by council buildings, each with a distinctive architectural style: Wellington Town Hall and council offices, the Michael Fowler Centre, the Central Library, the City to Sea bridge, and the City Gallery. The main tiled area is the roof of the underground library car park.

The square is paved with yellow terracotta bricks and has an iconic Neil Dawson sculpture, a 3.4 metre diameter sphere using sculpted leaves of several ferns endemic to New Zealand, suspended 14 metres over its centre. The wide City-to-Sea pedestrian bridge acts as a gateway from Civic Square to Wellington's waterfront.

The square is used for public events and is a popular place for office workers to eat their lunch on warm summer days.

History 
The first real plans for the Civic Square date back to 1944.

In 1987, the Wellington City Council appointed Fletcher Development and Construction Ltd as the project developers. The project involved building a new library, conversion of the existing library into the City Gallery, extension and refurbishment of City Council buildings, earthquake strengthening and refurbishment of the Town Hall, car parking space, design of the new public space and a link to the waterfront. The project was completed in 1992.

On 14 June 2018, as part of the City Council's new te reo Māori policy, Te Taiahu, the Square was renamed to "Te Ngākau Civic Square".  The new name, meaning 'the heart', was gifted to the city by local iwi Taranaki Whānui ki te Upoko o te Ika a Māui.

See also
 Aotea Square, Auckland
 Cathedral Square, Christchurch
 The Octagon, Dunedin

References

External links
 Wellington City Council Art and Architecture

Wellington City
Tourist attractions in Wellington City
Squares in New Zealand
Wellington Central, Wellington